Statistics of Lao League in the 2006 season.

Overview
Vientiane FC won the championship.

References
RSSSF

Lao Premier League seasons
1
Laos
Laos